The Eastern School District was a Canadian school district in Prince Edward Island, from the 1990s to 2012.

The Eastern School District was an Anglophone district operating 43 public schools (gr. 1–12) in Queens and Kings Counties with its headquarters in Stratford. Current enrollment was approximately 14,300 students and 700 teachers.

The Eastern School District was created in the 1990s when Regional School Unit 3 and Regional School Unit 4 were merged.

In 2012 the English Language School Board was created when the Eastern School District and Western School Board were merged.

Bluefield Family
Bluefield High School
Central Queens Elementary School
East Wiltshire Intermediate School
Eliot River Elementary School
Englewood Consolidated School
Gulf Shore Consolidated School
Westwood Primary School

Charlottetown Rural Family
Charlottetown Rural High School
Donagh Regional School
Glen Stewart Elementary School
Lucy Maud Montgomery Elementary School
Sherwood Elementary School
Stonepark Intermediate School
Stratford Elementary School

Colonel Gray Family
Colonel Gray High School
Birchwood Intermediate School
Parkdale Elementary School
Prince Street Elementary School
Queen Charlotte Junior High School
St. Jean Elementary School
Spring Park Elementary School
West Kent Elementary School
West Royalty Elementary School

Montague Family
Montague Regional High School
Belfast Consolidated School
Cardigan Elementary School
Georgetown Elementary School
Montague Consolidated School
Montague Intermediate School
Southern Kings Consolidated School
Vernon River Consolidated School

Morell Family
Morell Regional High School
Morell Consolidated School
Mt. Stewart Elementary School

Souris Family
Souris Regional High School
Souris Consolidated School

See also
Western School Board
Commission scolaire de langue française

External links
 Eastern School District - Prince Edward Island, Canada

Former school districts in Prince Edward Island